Twentyman is an English-language surname. Notable people include:

 Collier Twentyman Smithers (1867–1943), Argentine-born English painter
 Geoff Twentyman (1930–2004), English football scout and former player/manager known for his links to Liverpool
 Geoff Twentyman Jr. (born 1959), English radio broadcaster and former footballer, son of mentioned above
 Lawrence Holme Twentyman (1783–1852), English silversmith
 Les Twentyman, Australian activist
 Richard Twentyman (1903–1979), English architect based in Wolverhampton
 William Holme Twentyman (1802–1884), English silversmith
 Percy Twentyman-Jones (1876–1954), South African cricketer, rugby union player, and judge 

English-language surnames